Joseph Bullock  (1731–1808) was an English country landowner of Caversfield, Bicester and politician who sat in the House of Commons from 1770 to 1775.

Biography
Bullock was the son of Henry Bullock of Stanwell, Middlesex and his wife  Mary and was born on 11 December 1731. He was educated at Eton College from 1742 to 1748 and matriculated at Merton College, Oxford in 1749. He married Anne Walter, daughter of Peter Walter, MP  of Stalbridge, Dorset. In 1764 Bullock purchased the manor of Caversfield from John Southcote for £3,400 with an annual payment of £40 life annuity to his brother George Southcote alias Parker.

In  1768 Bullock stood on the interest of his friend Lord Verney at Carmarthen, but was defeated and petitioned  unsuccessfully. Verney had him returned as Member of Parliament for Wendover at a by-election on 6 September 1770. In the 1774 general election  Bullock had to run at his own expense as Verney could not  afford to return his friends for nothing. Bullock then vacated his seat in March 1775.

Bullock was High Sheriff of Buckinghamshire in 1781. He died on 13 April 1808 leaving a daughter Amelia Frances Marsham, wife of Canon the Hon. Jacob Marsham who inherited his estate.

References

1731 births
1808 deaths
People educated at Eton College
Alumni of Merton College, Oxford
British MPs 1768–1774
British MPs 1774–1780
Members of the Parliament of Great Britain for English constituencies
High Sheriffs of Buckinghamshire